The Mazda MX-5 is a lightweight two-passenger sports car manufactured and marketed by Mazda with a front mid-engine, rear-wheel-drive layout.

Manufactured at Mazda's Hiroshima plant, the MX-5 debuted in 1989 at the Chicago Auto Show and was conceived and executed under a tightly focused design credo, meaning "oneness of horse and rider". Widely noted for its small, light, technologically modern, dynamically balanced and minimally complex design, the MX-5 has frequently been called a spiritual successor to 1950s and '60s Italian and British roadster sports cars. The Lotus Elan was used as a design benchmark.

Generations were internally designated with a two-letter code, beginning with the first generation, the NA. The second generation (NB) launched in 1998 for MY 1999; followed by the third generation (NC) in 2005 for MY 2006, and the fourth generation (ND) in 2015 for MY 2016.

As the best-selling two-seat convertible sports car in history, the MX-5 has been marketed globally, with production exceeding one million, as of early 2016. The name  derives from Old High German for "reward".

Generations and overview
The original MX-5 was launched at a time when small roadsters had almost disappeared from the market, with the Alfa Romeo Spider being one of the only comparable models still in production at the time. However, even the Spider was not a direct competitor of the MX-5 due to its significantly higher price tag. That left the Mazda as the spiritual successor to a host of discontinued sports cars such as the MG B, Triumph TR7, Triumph Spitfire, and Fiat Spider.

The MX-5 was officially introduced in February 1989 at the Chicago Auto Show, and the public immediately resonated with the new sports car. The first generation MX-5 would go on to be the most popular of the four MX-5 generations by a wide margin, with over 228,961 units sold in the United States between 1989 and 1997.

The lightweight, unibody MX-5 boasts sharp, responsive handling and a curb weight of under 2,500 pounds. Notably, the MX-5 incorporates a longitudinal truss, marketed as the Powerplant Frame (PPF), that provides a rigid connection between the engine and differential to minimize flex and improve balance. Some MX-5 models feature limited slip differentials, traction control, and an anti-lock braking system. 

With an approximate 50:50 front/rear weight balance, the car has nearly neutral handling. Inducing oversteer is easy and very controllable, thus making the MX-5 a popular choice for amateur and stock racing, autocross, and club racing.  

The MX-5 has won numerous awards, including Wheels Magazine’s Car of the Year for 1989, 2005 and 2016; Sports Car International’s "best sports car of the 1990s" and "ten best sports cars of all time"; 2005–2006 Car of the Year Japan; and 2005 Australian Car of the Year. The MX-5 has also made Car and Driver magazine's annual 10 Best list 17 times. In their December 2009 issue, Grassroots Motorsports magazine named the MX-5 as the most important sports car built during the previous 25 years. As production continues and generations are added, the core idea, dimensions and basic technology remain, with technological advancements added with each revised version, while adhering to the original goals that led to its creation.

In 2009, English automotive critic Jeremy Clarkson wrote:

Design genesis
In 1976, Bob Hall, a journalist at Motor Trend magazine who was an expert in Japanese cars and fluent in the language, met Kenichi Yamamoto and Gai Arai, head of Research and Development at Mazda. Yamamoto and Gai Arai asked Hall what kind of car Mazda should make in the future:

In 1981, Hall moved to a product planning position with Mazda USA and again met Yamamoto, now chairman of Mazda Motors, who remembered their conversation about a roadster and in 1982 gave Hall the go-ahead to research the idea further. At this time Hall hired designer Mark Jordan to join the newly formed Mazda design studio in Southern California. There, Hall and Jordan collaborated on the parameters of the initial image, proportion and visualization of the "light-weight sports" concept. In 1983, the idea turned concept was approved under the "Offline 55" program, an internal Mazda initiative that sought to change the way new models were developed. Thus, under head of project Masakatsu, the concept development was turned into a competition between the Mazda design teams in Tokyo and California.

The Californian team proposed a front-engine, rear-wheel-drive layout, codenamed Duo 101, in line with the British roadster ancestry, but their Japanese counterparts favored the more common front-engine, front-wheel-drive layout or the rear mid-engine, rear-wheel-drive layout.

The first round of judging the competing designs was held in April 1984, with designs presented on paper only. The mid-engined car appeared to offer favorable qualities, although it was known at the time that such a layout would struggle to meet the noise, vibration, and harshness (NVH) requirements of the project. It was only at the second round of the competition in August 1984, when full-scale clay models were presented, that the Duo 101 won the competition and was selected as the basis for what would become the MX-5.

The Duo 101, so named as either a soft top or hardtop could be used, incorporated many key stylistic cues inspired by the Lotus Elan, a 1960s roadster, including the door handles, tail lamps and grille opening as well as engine appearance and center console layout. It is known that Mazda design studio acquired a vintage Lotus Elan as a source of inspiration for the designers. International Automotive Design (IAD) in Worthing, England was commissioned to develop a running prototype, codenamed V705. It was built with a fiberglass body, a  engine from a Mazda Familia and components from a variety of early Mazda models. The V705 was completed in August 1985 and taken to the US where it rolled on the roads around Santa Barbara, California and got positive reactions.

The project received final approval on 18 January 1986. The model's codename was changed to P729 as it moved into the production phase, under head of program Toshihiko Hirai. The task of constructing five engineering mules (more developed prototypes) was again allocated to IAD, which also conducted the first front and rear crash tests on the P729. While Tom Matano, Mark Jordan, Wu-huang Chin (also on the RX-7 team), Norman Garrett, and  worked on the final design, the project was moved to Japan for engineering and production details.

By 1989, with a definitive model name now chosen, the MX-5 was ready to be introduced to the world as a true lightweight sports car, weighing just .

Although Mazda's concept was for the MX-5 to be an inexpensive sports car, at introduction the design met strong demand, with many dealers placing customers on pre-order lists and several dealers across North America increasing the vehicle markup.

Jinba ittai

Mazda used a design credo across the four generations of the MX-5's development: the phrase , which translates into English as "rider and horse (jinba) as one body (ittai)".

With the first generation of the MX-5, the phrase was developed into five specific core design requirements:
 That the car be as compact and as light as possible while meeting global safety requirements;
 that the cockpit comfortably accommodate two full-stature occupants with no wasted space;
 that the basic layout continue with the original's front-midship rear-drive configuration with the engine positioned ahead of the driver but behind the front axle for 50:50 weight distribution;
 that all four wheels be attached by wishbone or multi-link suspension systems to maximize tire performance, road grip, and dynamic stability;
 and that a power-plant frame again provide a solid connection between the engine and rear-mounted differential to sharpen throttle response.

First generation (NA) 

The first generation MX-5 was introduced in 1989 and was in production until 1997. Upon its release, the car won numerous accolades such as Automobile Magazine's 1990 Automobile of the Year and Car and Drivers 10Best list from 1990 to 1992. It initially featured a  inline-four engine making 116 horsepower; in late 1993, a larger 1.8-liter engine was made standard in most markets.

The MX-5 was designed with inspiration from the Lotus Elan, and features such as pop-up headlights, unique to the NA model, and slim chrome door handles pay homage to the famous British roadster. To keep the weight down, base models were not equipped with power steering or power brakes. A five-speed manual transmission was standard, with the option of a four-speed automatic also available. 

The NA MX-5 is also noteworthy for its special editions, including the 1991 BRG model with its British Racing Green exterior paint and tan leather upholstery. Other special or notable models include the enthusiast-minded R Package variants, the M Edition models and the VR limited of which 700 Artvin Red Mica and 800 Excellent Green Mica were built.

Second generation (NB) 

The second generation MX-5 was unveiled in 1997 and put on sale in 1998 for the 1999 model year. While it kept the same proportions of its predecessor, its most noticeable change was the removal of the retractable headlamps, which were eliminated in the face of more stringent pedestrian safety tests. The NB model of the MX-5 featured a slight increase in engine power, a refined interior design and the option of a six-speed manual transmission. In 2001, the model underwent revisions, the second generation boasted a slight increase in engine power, a more refined interior with an updated design, and a newly available six-speed manual transmission. In 2001, further revisions included slightly updated front and rear styling as well as variable-valve timing engine technology for the 1.8-liter engine, which now made . Updated models have since been known as NB2, while the earlier versions are referred to as NB1. While various special editions continued to be introduced throughout the entire NB production run, the Mazdaspeed MX-5 is distinctive for being the only MX-5 to be turbocharged at the factory. The Mazdaspeed variant, built for the model years 2004 and 2005, made  from a turbocharged version of the normal 1.8-liter engine, enabling a quarter-mile time of 15.2 seconds and a  time of 6.7 seconds. Other Mazdaspeed specs include stiffer and shorter springs, Bilstein shocks, and larger 17-inch wheels.

Third generation (NC) 

Taking design cues from the 2003 Mazda Ibuki concept car, the third-generation Mazda MX-5 was introduced in 2005 and was in production until 2015. This generation introduced Power Retractable Hard Top (PRHT),  a variant featuring a folding hard top mechanism that does not encroach on trunk space. During its release, the third generation MX-5 received several accolades such as the 2005-2006 Car of the Year Japan Award and Car and Drivers 10Best list from 2006 to 2013.

Fourth generation (ND) 

The fourth-generation Mazda MX-5 was unveiled in 2014 and has been in production since 2015. The ND generation introduced a Retractable Fastback (RF) variant that features a rigid roof and buttresses that give the silhouette a more coupé-like appearance than the soft top convertible. The fourth generation MX-5 has received several accolades such as the 2015-2016 Car of the Year Japan Award, the 2016 World Car of the Year Award, Car and Drivers 10Best list from 2016 to 2019, and the Red Dot Best of the Best Award in Product Design 2017. In addition, the car is the basis for the Fiat 124 Spider and Abarth 124 Spider.

Production numbers and details
In 2000, the Guinness Book of World Records declared the MX-5 the best-selling two-seat sports car in history, with a total production of 531,890 units. The 250,000th MX-5 rolled out of the factory on November 9, 1992; the 500,000th, on February 8, 1999; the 750,000th, in March 2004; the 800,000th in January 2007, and the 900,000th in February 2011.

On April 22, 2016, Mazda broke its Guinness World Record by producing its one millionth MX-5. The one millionth car rolled off the production line and was shown in select cities, where the first 240 fans of the vehicle present could physically sign it before it went to the next destination.

Awards and recognition
Automobile Magazine 1990 "Automobile of the Year" and "All-Stars" list in 2016.
Car and Drivers 10Best list from 1990-1992, 1998-1999, 2001, 2006-2013, 2016-2019.
Car of the Year Japan Award 2005-2006 and 2015-2016.
2006 World Car of the Year Awards: "World Car of the Year" Finalist.
2012 Autocar Indonesia Reader's Choice Award, Favorite Convertible.
What Car? Magazine 2014 Used Car of the Year - Best Fun Car.
Yahoo! Autos 2016 Fresh Ride of the Year.
 Roadshow by CNET Editors Choice Best Convertibles 2016.
World Car of the Year at the 2016 World Car Awards (UK).
2016 World Car of the Year Awards: "World Car of the Year" and "World Car Design of the Year".
2016 UK Car of the Year.
The Daily Telegraph 2016 Car of the Year.
Auto Express 2017 Roadster of the Year.
Red Dot Best of the Best Award: Product Design 2017.
New York Daily News DNA Award 2018.
What Car? Magazine 2018 Best Convertible Less Than £25,000.
MotorWeek Drivers' Choice Awards Best Convertible 2018.
2018 RJC Car of the Year Special Award: Classic Car Restoration Service.
Edmunds.com 2019 Editor's Choice Awards: Best Sports Car.
iSeeCars named the Mazda MX-5 Miata as the top sports car that US owners keep the longest.

See also
 Spec Miata, a class of racing cars in the US
 Global MX-5 Cup, a Spec Miata series sanctioned by IMSA.
 MaX5 Racing, a class of racing cars in the United Kingdom
 Simpson Design, US-based custom coachbuilder producing bodies and interior for the Miata MX-5

References

Bibliography
 Long, B. MX-5 Miata – The full story of the world's favourite sports car, Veloce Publishing, 2002. .
 Carey, J. (March, 2005). "New Mazda MX-5". Wheels (Australia), p. 48.

External links

 (US)
 (The Story of the MX-5)
 

 
MX-5
Cars introduced in 1989
1990s cars
2000s cars
2010s cars
2020s cars
Sports cars
Roadsters
Hardtop convertibles
Front mid-engine, rear-wheel-drive vehicles
Cars powered by longitudinal 4-cylinder engines
Euro NCAP roadster sports cars